, born , was a Japanese actor and singer who appeared in over 200 films. Affectionately referred to as "Ken-san" by audiences, he was best known for his brooding style and the stoic presence he brought to his roles. He won the Japan Academy Prize for Outstanding Performance by an Actor in a Leading Role four times, more than any other actor. Takakura additionally received the Japanese Medal of Honor with purple ribbon in 1998, the Person of Cultural Merit award in 2006, and the Order of Culture in 2013.

Life and career
Takakura was born in Nakama, Fukuoka in 1931. He attended Tochiku High School in nearby Yahata City, where he was a member of the boxing team and English society. It was around this time that he gained his streetwise swagger and tough-guy persona watching yakuza movies. This subject was covered in one of his most famous movies, Showa Zankyo-den (Remnants of Chivalry in the Showa Era), in which he played an honorable old-school yakuza among the violent post-war gangs. After graduating from Meiji University in Tokyo, Takakura attended an audition on impulse in 1955 at the Toei Film Company while applying for a managerial position.

Toei found a natural in Takakura as he debuted with Denko Karate Uchi (Lightning Karate Blow) in 1956. In 1959 he married singer Chiemi Eri, but divorced in 1971. His breakout role would be in the 1965 film Abashiri Prison, and its sequel Abashiri Bangaichi: Bokyohen (Abashiri Prison: Longing for Home, also 1965), in which he played an ex-con antihero. By the time Takakura left Toei in 1976, he had appeared in over 180 films.

He gained international recognition after starring in the 1970 war film Too Late the Hero as the cunning Imperial Japanese Major Yamaguchi, the 1974 Sydney Pollack sleeper hit The Yakuza with Robert Mitchum, and is probably best known in the West for his role in Ridley Scott's Black Rain (1989), in which he surprises American cops played by Michael Douglas and Andy García with the line, "I do speak fucking English". He again appeared to Western audiences with the 1992 Fred Schepisi comedy Mr. Baseball starring Tom Selleck.

Takakura was one of the few Japanese actors who experienced popularity in China, due to his appearance in Junya Satō's 1976 crime drama Kimi yo Fundo no Kawa o Watare (known in some territories as Manhunt), the first foreign film shown after the Cultural Revolution. He also starred the titular assassin in Junya Satō's Golgo 13 (1973), a Japanese–Iranian production and the first live-action adaptation of the Japanese manga series Golgo 13.

He appeared in three films since 2000:  in May 2001, Riding Alone for Thousands of Miles, by Chinese director Zhang Yimou, in late December 2005, and Yasuo Furuhata's Anata e (Dearest) in late August 2012, after a six-year hiatus. He died of lymphoma on November 10, 2014. Shintaro Ishihara described him as "the last big star (in Japan)." A huge number of Chinese internet users expressed their sympathies and condolences, including many celebrities in the Chinese movie industry. The spokesman of China's Ministry of Foreign Affairs Hong Lei said that Takakura made significant contributions to the cultural exchange between China and Japan.

A documentary based on Takakura's life entitled Ken San premiered at the 2016 Cannes Film Festival and was released in Japanese theaters on August 20, 2016. It was directed by photographer Yuichi Hibi and features interviews with filmmakers and actors such as Martin Scorsese, Paul Schrader, Michael Douglas, John Woo, and Yoji Yamada.

Filmography

Honours 

Japan Academy Prize for Outstanding Performance by an Actor in a Leading Role
1978 – as Yusaku Shima, in The Yellow Handkerchief
1981 – as Kōsaku Tajima, in A Distant Cry from Spring
1982 – as Eiji Mikami, in Station
1999 – as Otomatsu Satō, in Poppoya
Japan Academy Prize for Special Award of Honour from the Association
2013
Blue Ribbon Awards
1977 – as Yusaku Shima, in The Yellow Handkerchief
1999 – as Otomatsu Satō, in Poppoya
Japanese Medal of Honor (Purple Ribbon) (1998)
Person of Cultural Merit (2006)
Order of Culture (2013)
Junior Third Rank (2014; posthumous)

References

External links
 
 

1931 births
2014 deaths
People from Nakama, Fukuoka
Japanese male film actors
Actors from Fukuoka Prefecture
Recipients of the Medal with Purple Ribbon
Persons of Cultural Merit
Recipients of the Order of Culture
Meiji University alumni
Musicians from Fukuoka Prefecture
Deaths from cancer in Japan
Deaths from lymphoma